Pheasant Island is one of the two islands in the south of the lake of Großer Eutiner See, which itself lies in the borough of  in the district of  in the German state of Schleswig-Holstein.

From the 9th century, Pheasant Island was the site of a Wendish castle which was given the name Utin and was the centre of the eponymous . The castle was linked to the shore over a bridge.

The castle was destroyed in 1138/39 by the Holcetae during the conquest of Wagria.

Pheasant Island is one of the landmarks of the visual axes of the former Baroque garden of Eutin Castle.

The name "Pheasant Island" is derived from the old pheasantry that used to exist on the island.

Today, the island is privately owned and inhabited.

References

Bibliography 

 Otto Rönnpag: Die Fasaneninsel, der Ursprung Eutins. In: Jahrbuch für Heimatkunde Eutin, 1987, pp. 99–102.
 Gustav Peters: Von der Fasanerie auf dem Warder im Großen Eutiner See. In: Jahrbuch für Heimatkunde Eutin, 1973, p. 29.

External links 

 Data
 Information about the name
 Utin Castle
 The bridge to Utin Castle

Lake islands of Germany
Archaeological sites in Germany
Islands of Schleswig-Holstein
Ostholstein
Private islands of Europe
Eutin